Almighty Row is the first full-length album from singer/songwriter Jason Ward. It was self-released as a digital download in November 2009, receiving critical acclaim from several indie music blogs due to the album's sparse instrumentation and exceptionally dark lyrical content.

History

Ward recorded Almighty Row during the Winter/Spring of 2009, and it was promoted as a dark concept album, consisting of a cohesive ten-song structure. The instrumentation was primarily an acoustic guitar, with layered vocals, and various atmospheric overdubs, including organ, string arrangements, and piano.

Reception

Ward released Almighty Row as a free digital download in November 2009, receiving positive reviews from several blogs, including Altsounds, Snob's Music, Cougar Microbes, This Winki's, Underskn, Slowcoustic, and Listen Dammit. Cougar Microbes referred to Ward as "Neil Young on downers", while a positive review by Altsounds magazine stated, "He is Kurt Cobain if Nirvana had never happened...making music out of the public spotlight and staying well in control."

Track listing

References

External links 
 http://www.jason-ward.blogspot.com
 http://www.myspace.com/jasondward

2009 debut albums
Self-released albums